The Minneapolis City Conference is the Minnesota State High School League-sponsored high school sports league for schools in Minneapolis, Minnesota.

Members

Minnesota high school sports conferences
Minnesota State High School League
Sports in Minneapolis